Bokspits is a village in Kgalagadi District of Botswana. It is the southernmost village in Botswana and is located close to the border with South Africa next to the Kgalagadi Transfrontier Park. Bokspits has a creche, primary school, clinic, police station, post office, government offices, churches, airstrip  and various shops (supermarkets, co-operative, general dealers, restaurants and a number of bars and bottlestores). There is a number of football teams for example the most famous one Bokspits United FC. Bokspits has experienced a great deal of growth and development e.g. tarred roads and communication networks (be mobile, mascom & Orange). The population counted 507 in the 2011 census.

References

Kgalagadi District
Villages in Botswana
Botswana–South Africa border crossings